Local Band Does OKlahoma is the third live album by progressive rock band Umphrey's McGee. It was recorded just months after the addition of drummer Kris Myers. The album features excerpts of a small concert in Oklahoma City in 2003. Because of the low attendance of the concert, the band did not use a setlist and did very little preparation for the show. The band was so pleased with the results that they decided to release the highlights of the show via a live album initially available only through their website. The album was eventually released in stores months later, but has been out of print since 2005 but was released in December 2009 as part of the CustUm Flash Drive that included the complete Umphrey's McGee discography.

Track listing
 FDR
 Der Bluten Kat
 Pennis 
 10th Grade
 Der Bluten Kat (continued)
 Divisions
 Glory
 Divisions (continued)
 Der Bluten Kat (continued)

Personnel
Brendan Bayliss: guitar, vocals
Jake Cinninger: guitar, vocals
Joel Cummins: keyboards
Ryan Stasik: bass
Kris Myers: drums
Andy Farag: percussion
Rob Heimbrock: Graphic Design

Umphrey's McGee albums
2003 live albums